Luca Zanatta (born May 31, 1989) is an Italian former professional ice hockey player who was a member of the Italian national team.

Career
He started in the juvenile hockey team HC Lugano, where his father has been assistant coach and suddenly coach of the first team.

After the sportive debut in the Swiss 1. Liga with the Hockey Club Ceresio, in 2009 he returned to Italy, where he enrolled the SG Cortina for five seasons, winning the 2011-2012 Italian Cup. In February 2012, he had an accident that obliged him to a period of medical rehabilitation.

For the years 2014-2015, he come back to Switzerland, where he and his brother Michael signed a contract with the HC Red Ice, playing in the Swiss League. The following season, because the Red Ice Martigny had lost the playoffs he was to the Genève-Servette HC, starting to play in the National League.

After the elimination of the Martigny during the playoffs, Zanatta signed a two-year contract with the EHC Olten.

In 2014, he started on playing with the Italian National Team. 
The next year, he participated at the 2015 First Division Worl Cup in Poland. In 2017, he participated to the IIHF World Championship.

References

External links

1989 births
Living people
Italian ice hockey defencemen
EHC Basel players
SG Cortina players
Italian expatriate ice hockey people
Genève-Servette HC players
EHC Olten players
HC Red Ice players
Italian expatriate sportspeople in Switzerland
Sportspeople from the Province of Belluno